Javier Estrada (born 12 November 1964), is a Spanish-Argentinian finance professor and finance author.  Estrada is a professor of finance at the IESE Business School in Barcelona, Spain, and specializes in portfolio management, risk management, and wealth management.  He was educated at the Universidad de La Plata, and the University of Illinois at Urbana–Champaign.  Estrada has published a number of books on finance.  He is also regularly quoted in the main financial news media, including The Wall Street Journal, The Financial Times, Bloomberg, Barron's, Forbes, and other financial media.

Published works

See also
Fed model

References

External links

Jaiver Estrada (IESE Business School biography)
Javier Estrada, (American Association of Individual Investors author page)

1964 births
University of Illinois Urbana-Champaign alumni
Financial writers
Textbook writers
Male non-fiction writers
National University of La Plata alumni
Living people